Jan Neckář (born 28 November 1946) is a Czech wrestler. He competed in the men's Greco-Roman 57 kg at the 1972 Summer Olympics.

References

External links
 

1946 births
Living people
Czech male sport wrestlers
Olympic wrestlers of Czechoslovakia
Wrestlers at the 1972 Summer Olympics
Place of birth missing (living people)